Besos y Copas Desde Hollywood is a live album released by Regional Mexican singer Jenni Rivera on September 12, 2006. It was recorded in Los Angeles, California.

Track listing
 Por un Amor/Cucurrucucu Paloma 
 Juro Que Nunca Volvere 
 Querida Socia
 Soy Madre Soltera (Madre Soltera)
 La Tequilera
 Homenaje a Mi Madre
 Cuando Yo Queria Ser Grande
 Las Mismas Costumbres
 Amiga Si Lo Ves
 Que Se Te Olvido
 Que Me Vas a Dar
 Besos y Copas
 Mil Heridas

Chart performance

References

2006 live albums
Fonovisa Records live albums
Jenni Rivera live albums
Spanish-language live albums
Jenni Rivera video albums
Fonovisa Records video albums